Wylandville is a census-designated place located in North Strabane Township, Washington County in the state of Pennsylvania, United States. The community is located in northern Washington County along Pennsylvania Route 519.  As of the 2010 census the population was 391 residents.

References

Census-designated places in Washington County, Pennsylvania
Census-designated places in Pennsylvania